J'Kaylin Dobbins (born December 17, 1998) is an American football running back for the Baltimore Ravens of the National Football League (NFL). He played college football at Ohio State and was drafted by the Ravens in the second round of the 2020 NFL Draft.

Early years
Dobbins attended La Grange High School in La Grange, Texas. During his high school football career, he had 5,149 yards and 74 touchdowns. He rushed for 2,243 yards and 37 touchdowns as a sophomore and 2,740 yards and 35 touchdowns as a junior. He played in only one game his senior year due to an injury. Despite his injury, Dobbins was a highly-touted four-star prospect, and received over twenty scholarship offers from Power Five conferences. All major recruiting websites ranked him in the top five among his 2017 class for his position and in the top ten for players from the state of Texas. 247Sports and ESPN.com ranked him as a top-50 recruit in the country.  After some speculation that he would sign with Texas or Oklahoma, Dobbins committed to Ohio State University to play college football.

College career

In his first game at Ohio State in 2017, Dobbins rushed for 181 yards on 29 carries against Indiana. Dobbins had earned the start over the returning 2016 Big Ten Freshman of the Year Mike Weber who was recovering from an injury. In his first season, he eclipsed 100 rushing yards in six games and became only the fourth freshman in Ohio State history to eclipse the 1,000 yard rushing mark in a season. During the 2017 Big Ten Football Championship Game, Dobbins overtook Maurice Clarett for the most rushing yards by a Freshman with his 174-yard, MVP performance. During a 24–7 Cotton Bowl Classic win against USC, Dobbins set the Freshman rushing record at 1,403 yards.

Despite a record-setting 2017 season , Dobbins' would once again split time with Weber during his Sophomore year. The time split paired with Dwayne Haskins' award-winning performance at quarterback lead to a decrease in productivity for Dobbins. He ended the season with 1,053 yards rushing, but remained the team's leading rusher. Notably, he had his first 200+ yard rushing game against Maryland.

In 2019, Dobbins would enter his Junior season with high expectations. These expectations were met when he went on to gain 100+ yards in ten games during the season. This included a four-touchdown performance against Michigan that stemmed from 211 yards rushing. He finished his season as the only Buckeye in history to rush for more than 2,000 yards in a season, passing Eddie George. Dobbins was a Doak Walker Award finalist and finished sixth for the Heisman Trophy. He was named First-team All-Big Ten and First-team All-American as an All-Purpose player by the Football Writers Association of America.

On December 30, 2019, Dobbins announced his intention to forgo his senior season and enter the 2020 NFL Draft. He left Ohio State with a total of 4,459 yards rushing, which makes him second all time. He won four Big Ten Offensive Player of the Week Awards, three Big Ten titles and two bowl games.

Statistics
Dobbins' statistics are as follows:

Professional career

Dobbins was selected in the second round of the 2020 NFL Draft with the 55th overall pick by the Baltimore Ravens. The Ravens previously traded tight end Hayden Hurst to the Atlanta Falcons to acquire the pick used on Dobbins.

2020 season

In his NFL debut against the Cleveland Browns on September 13, 2020, Dobbins had seven carries for 22 yards and scored his first two career rushing touchdowns in a 38–6 victory in Week 1. In Week 8 against the Pittsburgh Steelers, he had his first 100-yard rushing game with 15 carries for 113 rushing yards in the 24–28 loss. He was placed on the reserve/COVID-19 list by the team on November 23, 2020, and activated on December 4.
Dobbins first start in his career came in a Week 16 27–13 win over the New York Giants. He finished the game with 11 carries for 77 yards and a touchdown. In Week 17 against the Cincinnati Bengals, Dobbins rushed for 160 yards and 2 touchdowns during the 38–3 win.

2021 season
Dobbins suffered a torn ACL in the final preseason game against the Washington Football Team on August 28, 2021, and was placed on injured reserve a few days later. Dobbins did not play the entire 2021 season and was put into rehab during his time off.

2022 season
Dobbins was cleared for full-time starter duty after missing the first two weeks of the season. However, he suffered another knee injury in Week 6 and was placed on injured reserve on October 22, 2022. He was activated from injured reserve on December 10, 2022.

NFL career statistics

Notes

References

External links

Baltimore Ravens bio
Ohio State Buckeyes bio

Living people
1998 births
People from La Grange, Texas
Players of American football from Texas
American football running backs
Ohio State Buckeyes football players
Baltimore Ravens players
All-American college football players